Daiane Rodrigues may refer to:

Daiane Rodrigues (footballer, born 1983)
Daiane Rodrigues (footballer, born 1986)